The Senate is the upper house of the Parliament of Equatorial Guinea.

History
The Senate was established following constitutional reforms approved in a referendum in 2011 and enacted in February 2012. The first elections were held in May 2013.

Presidents of the Senate

Membership
The Senate has 70 members, of which 55 are elected and 15 are appointed by the President.

Notes

References

Politics of Equatorial Guinea
Equatorial
2012 establishments in Equatorial Guinea